Michele Zerial (born March 9, 1987 in Trieste) is an Italian sprint canoer who competed in the late 2000s. At the 2008 Summer Olympics in Beijing, he was eliminated in the semifinals of the K-1 500 m event.

References
 Sports-Reference.com profile

1987 births
Canoeists at the 2008 Summer Olympics
Italian male canoeists
Living people
Olympic canoeists of Italy
Sportspeople from Trieste
Italian people of Slovene descent